Caher is an Anglicised form of the Irish language word cathair (meaning "stone ringfort") and may refer to: Caher

Historical
 Cathair, a general term for a stone ringfort in Ireland

Places
Anglicised forms of many Irish place-names, such as
 Caher Island an uninhabited island off the coast of County Mayo.
 Cahir (sometimes spelled Caher) a town in South Tipperary in Ireland.
 Several  historic Electoral divisions in Ireland - including places named "Caher" in Clare, Cork, Kerry, Queen's County (Laois), and Tipperary:
 In County Clare, Scarriff SRD, several townlands named Caher in Ogonnelloe civil parish in Tulla Lower barony and in Feakle civil parish in Tulla Upper barony.
 In County Cork (East Riding section), SRD Youghal, a townland named Caher in Mogeely civil parish in Kinnatalloon barony.
 In County Cork (West Riding section), six townlands in six separate SRDs and DEDs.
 In County Kerry, three townlands in three separate SRDs and DEDs.
 In County Laois (Queens), two townlands, both in the civil parish of Offerlane in Upperwoods barony, Abbeyleix SRD, Caher DED.
 In County Tipperary (South Riding section), a civil parish (containing Caher Town) in Iffa and Offa West barony, Clogheen SRD, Caher DED.

Geographical
 Caher Mountain (Kerry) (1,000 metres), the third highest peak in Ireland; part of the MacGillycuddy's Reeks range.
 Caher Mountain (Cork) (338 metres), a hill near Kilcrohane in County Cork, Ireland